Hacıosman (Ubykh: Lakaşhüe or Lek'uaşe) is a small village in Manyas district of Balıkesir Province, Turkey. It had a population of 134, according to a 2000 census.

Until 1992, it was one of the few villages in the world where the inhabitants spoke the Ubykh language in their daily lives. The last speaker of Ubykh, Tevfik Esenç, was born, and died, in this village.

Other villages where Ubykh was spoken included Kırkpınar and Hacı Yakup.

References

Villages in Manyas District